The El Paso Open was a golf tournament on the PGA Tour in the late 1920s and the 1950s. It was played at the El Paso Country Club in El Paso, Texas. In 1929, Bill Mehlhorn won with a score of 271, then a record for a 72-hole tournament.

Winners

See also
El Paso Open (a Ben Hogan Tour event)

References

Former PGA Tour events
Golf in Texas
Sports in El Paso, Texas